Robert Clark (born  in Hamilton) is a Scottish former professional footballer who is best known for his time with Kilmarnock.

Clark began his career at Blantyre Victoria before joining Rangers in 1980. He stayed there for two seasons, making one appearance before moving on to Kilmarnock. After spells with Motherwell, a second term at Kilmarnock, Clark moved on to Albion Rovers in 1987. He enjoyed a successful spell at the club, making over one hundred and fifty appearances. Clark wound down his career at Stirling Albion and East Stirlingshire then re-joined the junior leagues with Shotts Bon Accord.

External links

1962 births
Living people
Rangers F.C. players
Association football defenders
Kilmarnock F.C. players
Motherwell F.C. players
Scottish Football League players
Scottish Junior Football Association players
Albion Rovers F.C. players
Stirling Albion F.C. players
East Stirlingshire F.C. players
Scottish footballers
Shotts Bon Accord F.C. players